Ray Darryl Tarver (December 24, 1921 – December 11, 1972) was an American politician and dentist. He served as a Democratic member of the Louisiana House of Representatives.

Tarver was born in Natchitoches, Louisiana. He attended Northwestern State University and Loyola University New Orleans. In 1964 he was elected to the Louisiana House of Representatives, serving until 1968.

Tarver died in December 1972 at the age of 51.

References 

1921 births
1972 deaths
Politicians from Natchitoches, Louisiana
Democratic Party members of the Louisiana House of Representatives
20th-century American politicians
American dentists
20th-century dentists
Northwestern State University alumni
Loyola University New Orleans alumni